Cacau may refer to:

 Cacau (born 1981), Claudemir Jerônimo Barreto, Brazilian-born German football striker
 Cacau (novel), by Brazilian writer Jorge Amado

See also
Cocoa (disambiguation)
Cacao (disambiguation)
Cacau Protásio (born 1975)